Psychrobacillus psychrodurans is a psychrotolerant bacterium from the genus of Psychrobacillus which has been isolated from garden soil from Egypt.

References

 

Bacillaceae
Bacteria described in 1967